HNK Đakovo Croatia is a Croatian football club based in the town of Đakovo in Croatia currently playing in the Treća HNL.

Đakovo was formed in June 2012, when two city rivals, NK Croatia Đakovo and NK Đakovo, merged due to financial troubles both clubs were facing.

References

Football clubs in Croatia
Football clubs in Osijek-Baranja County
Association football clubs established in 2012
2012 establishments in Croatia